Watlington may refer to:

Places
Watlington, Norfolk, England
Watlington, Oxfordshire, England
Whatlington, Sussex, England
Watlington, New Zealand

People with the surname
John Perry-Watlington (1823–1882), British politician
Neal Watlington (1922–2019), American baseball player
Samuel Watlington (fl. 1688–1711), British cloth merchant